The Catholic Church (Mighty Ezra) belongs to Iran's Catholic Christian community. It was built in 1912 and is located in the Mearmear of Tabriz. The church, built with a brick facade, measures 30 metres high by 15 metres wide with the bell tower located on a small balcony.

References 

  Editorial Board, East Azerbaijan Geography, Iranian Ministry of Education, 2000 (High School Text Book in Persian)
 http://www.eachto.ir

Tourist attractions in Tabriz
Architecture in Iran
Churches in Tabriz
Roman Catholic churches in Iran
Buildings of the Qajar period
1912 establishments in Iran